gTool is a mobile repair tools manufacturing company. Its headquarters is in Pretoria, South Africa.

History
gTool was founded by George Hajipetrou in a small mobile repair shop situated in the north of Johannesburg, South Africa. The company was created in order to meet the high demand for mobile phone repairs. The repair shop was later acquired  by a corporate firm. This gave George Hajipetrou an opportunity to concentrate on developing repair tools.

Products
gTool has created tools that allow mobile technicians to repair a range of mobile devices.

gTool DRS System
The DRS systems were sold to over 50 individuals, it is a 3 part system in which 1 machine does the freezing and another does laminating and 3rd a dust free chamber. Each system cost offer $7,000 US dollars, took 1 year to build. The system were sold to 50 individuals. The systems were used as a testing to perfect the final product. The latest systems will be launched first quarter of 2020. The Previous individuals who received the 50 machines will either be refunded or replaced with the new system.

The gTool ScreenJack
The gTool ScreenJack was created in 2014. It is the world's first professional iPhone opening tool. The tool enabled the user to open the iPhone 5, iPhone5S and iPhone 5C with ease without compromising the faulty phone any further.

The gTool iCorner
The gTool iCorner is used to rectify dented corners and sidewalls on iPads and iPhones. It works as a vice which fits over the affected area and when the knob is turned, it conforms the corner back to its original shape.

The gTool PanelPress
The gTool PanelPress is the first and only solution for fixing bent iPhones. It is regarded as the only device to ‘’unbend’’ the iPhone 6. The PanelPress is designed to repair the iPhone 5, iPhone5S, iPhone 5C as well as the iPhone 6 and iPhone 6 plus. The unbending of the iPhone can be done by passing through a few easy steps.

References

External links
Official Website

Manufacturing companies based in the City of Tshwane
Organisations based in Pretoria
Tool manufacturing companies of South Africa
South African brands